The Isuzu Journey (kana:いすゞ・ジャーニー) is a minibus produced by the Japanese manufacturer Isuzu since 1970, and in 1973 in its current somewhat larger format. The range was primarily available as a city bus and a tourist coach.

In Japan, the Asia-Pacific region, the Middle East, Africa, and South America, its principal competitors are the Mitsubishi Fuso Rosa, Mazda Parkway, Nissan Civilian, and Toyota Coaster. The current W41 series Journey was based on Civilian.

History 
The first use of the "Journey" nameplate was on the 1970 "Journey S". This was an Isuzu Elf 150 truck with a 15-seater bus rear and has a KA5#B chassis code. The Elf had been available as a compact bus since 1964 but was originally still called an Elf. This was replaced in 1981 by the more space efficient and lighter Isuzu Fargo series.

In 1973, the 26-seater Journey M (on an Elf 250-basis) and the longer 29-seat Journey L (Elf 350) were manufactured with diesel engines of 2.8 and 3.6 litres respectively. These engines were later upgraded to more powerful, cleaner units. A much larger (53 seats) rear-engine bus called Journey K appeared in 1972 and was replaced by the Isuzu Erga Mio in 1999. There was also a light duty Journey E, which is still made on the Elf basis but with bodywork supplied by an outside firm.

The Journey L and M were replaced by a rebadged Nissan Civilian in 1993.  The Isuzu Journey W40 and W41 are rebadged Nissan Civilian models.

Model Listing 
BE/BL/BM Series (1973-1993)
K Series (1972-1999)
W40 Series (1993-1999)
W41 Series (1999–present)

Isuzu Journey-M

Isuzu Journey-L

Isuzu Journey-J 
The Isuzu Journey-J is a rebadged Hino Liesse, available between 2003 and 2011.
PB-RX6J (2004)
BDG-RX6J (2007)

GMK (Chevrolet) BLD24 

GM Korea (Chevrolet) BLD24 was a licence made from Isuzu Journey M series Micro Bus.

GM Korea reentered micro bus division after taking over from Shinjin Motors in May 1973 which it continues to have the capacity of 25 passengers.  This model also equip with the Isuzu's 74 metric horsepower C240 4-cylinder diesel engine. Only 121 were made before they discontinued on September 1974.

 새한 BL
 いすゞ・ジャーニー: 2代目(1973-1993年)
 기업연혁: G.M코리아 (Daewoo Bus Company History: GM Korea)
 연혁: 1970~1980년대 (Daewoo Bus Company History: 1970-1980's) (Marquee picture of GMK BLD24)
Zyle Daewoo Bus History: 1970S/1980S (Marquee picture of GMK BLD24)
 대우 자동차, 이름, 뜻,종류 (Engine Layout [Saehan BL064])
 GMK버스 Chevrolet BLD24, Chevrolet BD50DL 차종에 대하여 [안정섭님께] (GMK (Chevrolet) BLD24 body dimension and its engine output)

References

External links 
Isuzu Journey Homepage
Isuzu Journey-J (city bus) Homepage
Isuzu Journey-J (tourist coach) Homepage

Minibuses
Vehicles introduced in 1970
1970 establishments in Japan
Buses of Japan
Isuzu buses